Woodridge is a town in North Dakota.

John Travers Wood immigrated here as a boy in 1901.

References 

Populated places in North Dakota